Nguyễn Thị Huyền (born 19 May 1993) is a Vietnamese runner and hurdler who specializes in the 400 m distance.

At the 2014 Asian Games Nguyễn finished seventh in the 400 metres and fifth in the 4 × 400 m relay.

At the 2015 Southeast Asian Games Nguyễn won the 400 m, 400 m hurdles, and 4×400 m relay and set games records in the latter two events. Her results in these games gave her two individual qualifying times for the 2015 World Championships in Athletics and the 2016 Olympics.

References

External links
 

1993 births
Living people
Vietnamese female sprinters
Vietnamese female hurdlers
World Athletics Championships athletes for Vietnam
Athletes (track and field) at the 2014 Asian Games
People from Nam Định province
Athletes (track and field) at the 2016 Summer Olympics
Olympic athletes of Vietnam
Southeast Asian Games medalists in athletics
Southeast Asian Games gold medalists for Vietnam
Competitors at the 2015 Southeast Asian Games
Competitors at the 2017 Southeast Asian Games
Asian Games competitors for Vietnam
Competitors at the 2019 Southeast Asian Games
21st-century Vietnamese women
Competitors at the 2021 Southeast Asian Games
20th-century Vietnamese women